The 2018 Great Yarmouth Borough Council election took place on 4 May 2018 to elect members of Great Yarmouth Borough Council in England. This was on the same day as other local elections in England. The Conservatives gained control of the council with UKIP which had previously won 10 seats being wiped out. Part of the Conservative success was attributed to former UKIP councillors defecting to them.

Overall result

|-bgcolor=#F6F6F6
| colspan=2 style="text-align: right; margin-right: 1em" | Total
| style="text-align: right;" | 14
| colspan=4 style="text-align: right;" |
| style="text-align: right;" | 
| style="text-align: right;" | 18,059
| style="text-align: right;" | 
|-
|}

Changes in vote share are relative to the last time these seats were contested in 2014.

Council Composition

Prior to the election the composition of the council was:

After the election the composition of the council was:

Ward results

Bradwell North

Bradwell South and Hopton

Caister North

Caister South

Central and Northgate

Claydon

East Flegg

Gorleston

Lothingland

Magdalen

Nelson

Southtown and Cobholm

Yarmouth North

References

2018 English local elections
2018